This is a list of railway stations in India. The railway operations are managed by Indian Railways (IR) in the country.

A

B

C

D

E

F

G

H

I

J

K

L

M

N

O

P

Q

R

S

T

U

V

W

Y

Z

See also 
 Rail transport in India
 Indian Railways

References

External links 
Downloaded and reformatted from official list